The Kwikwetlem, whose name is on the modern map as that of the City of Coquitlam, British Columbia, Canada, are a Coast Salish indigenous people whose traditional territories and modern reserves are located in that city and its neighbours Port Coquitlam and Port Moody. Speakers of Hunquminum, the Downriver dialect of Halkomelem, they were organized into the Kwikwetlem First Nation band government, formerly the Coquitlam Indian Band. They are related to the neighbouring Kwantlen and Katzie.

Lower Mainland
Coast Salish
First Nations in British Columbia